The Thames Barge Driving Race or Barge Race is a river-race that was set up in 1975 by a charity called The Transport On Water Association (TOW), now known as the Thames Barge Driving Trust with the backing of Members of Parliament and Members of the House of Lords in the United Kingdom.

The race
The race consists of about 11 teams of between four and eight members who steer and row 30 ton barges over a seven-mile course for about 90 minutes from Greenwich to Westminster Bridge. Considerable skill is needed to pilot unpowered barges 'rowed under oars' or sweeps and ride tidal river currents alone, up river. The event commemorates the skills of lightermen who moved freight this way along the Thames up until the 1930s and in a wider context it encourages ongoing interest in moving cargo via water and as a way to recruit younger people back into river trades.The teams are normally made up of employees of Thames lighterage companies, Port of London Authority or are sponsored by local businesses.

The best places to view the race are Tower Bridge, London Bridge and Westminster Bridge.

Historical context

During the 1970s Britain suffered a major energy crisis and many politicians in the UK and US were astutely looking at alternative ways to transport freight in ways that could reduce dependency on oil. The decline of the British Empire and the opening of Tilbury docks caused the closure of the upriver docks on the river Thames and started a steep decline in traditional London lighterage which had transported large amounts of coal. Between 1967 and 1976 over 40 lighterage firms closed down. At the same time the UKs domestic central heating market emerged oil quickly replacing coal. The race thus reflected a more pragmatic political ethos and was a way of keeping alive a dying industry and its river skills as the energy crisis deepened further.

Other river races on the tidal Thames
Thames Sailing Barge Match
Doggett's Coat and Badge
Shrimpers Regatta
Great River Race
Devizes to Westminster International Canoe Marathon
The University Boat Race
Head of the River Race
Women's Eights Head of the River Race
Schools' Head of the River Race
Veterans' Head of the River Race
Head of the River Fours
Veteran Fours' Head
Pairs Head
Scullers Head of the River Race
Wingfield Sculls
Hammersmith Head
Quintin Head
Southend Barge Match
Putney Town Regatta
Barnes and Mortlake Regatta
Bourne at Chiswick Regatta
Hammersmith Regatta
Richmond Regatta
Twickenham Regatta

See also

Lightermen
Watermen
Thames sailing barge
Thames Ton
Foster Yeoman
Cory Environmental

External links
 Official Thames Barge Driving Trust Website: https://www.thamesbargedriving.com
 2007 http://www.portoflondon.co.uk/display_fixedpage.cfm/id/308
 2006 http://www.greenlandpassage.co.uk/bargerace.html
 2005 https://web.archive.org/web/20071005031551/http://www.thamesworkboats.co.uk/Thames%20Barge%20Driving.htm
 2001 https://web.archive.org/web/20070928073721/http://www.thames.org.uk/pages/bargerace2001.html
 Port of London Interactive Leisure Map http://www.portoflondon.co.uk/display_fixedpage.cfm/id/550/site/leisure
 The Swiftstone Trust http://www.thames.org.uk/

Culture in London
Racing